The Sardar Sarovar Dam is a concrete gravity dam built on the Narmada River in Navagam near the town of Kevadiya, Narmada District, in the state of Gujarat, India. The dam was constructed to provide water and electricity to four Indian states: Gujarat, Madhya Pradesh, Maharashtra, and Rajasthan.

The project was a vision of the first deputy Prime Minister of India Sardar Vallabhbhai Patel (also known as Sardar Patel) and the foundation stone was laid by Jawaharlal Nehru. The project took form in 1979 as part of a development scheme funded by the World Bank through their International Bank for Reconstruction and Development, to increase irrigation and produce hydroelectricity, using a loan of US$200 million. The construction for dam begun in 1987, but the project was stalled by the Supreme Court of India in 1995 in the backdrop of Narmada Bachao Andolan over concerns of displacement of people. In 2000–01 the project was revived but with a lower height of 111 meters under directions from SC, which was later increased in 2006 to 123 meters and 139 meters in 2017. The Sardar Sarovar Dam is 1210 meters long. The dam was inaugurated in 2017 by Prime Minister Narendra Modi. The water level in the Sardar Sarovar Dam eventually reached its highest capacity at 138.7 metres on 15 September 2019.

As one of the 30 dams planned on river Narmada, the Sardar Sarovar Dam is the largest structure to be built. It is the second largest concrete dam in the world in terms of the volume of concrete used in its construction, after the Grand Coulee Dam across the Columbia River, US. It is a part of the Narmada Valley Project, a large hydraulic engineering project involving the construction of a series of large irrigation and hydroelectricity multi-purpose dams on the Narmada River. After a number of cases before the Supreme Court of India (1999, 2000, 2003), by 2014 the Narmada Control Authority had approved a series of changes in the final height and the associated displacement caused by the increased reservoir, from the original  to a final  from foundation. The project will irrigate 1.9 million hectare area, most of it in drought prone areas of Kutch and Saurashtra.

The dam's main power plant houses six 200 megawatts (MW) Francis pump-turbines to generate electricity and include a pumped-storage capability. Additionally, a power plant on the intake for the main canal contains five 50MW Kaplan turbine-generators. The total installed capacity of the power facilities is 1,450 MW.

The tallest statue in the world, the Statue of Unity, faces the dam. This statue has been created as a symbol of tribute to the dam's visionary Sardar Patel.

Geography
The dam is located in Gujarat's Narmada district and Kevadia village, on the border of Gujarat and Maharashtra. To the west of the dam, is Madhya Pradesh's Malwa plateau, where the Narmada river dissects the hills tracts and culminates in the Mathwar hills.

The dam is 1,210 meters long and stands 163 meters tall. The Sardar Sarovar reservoir has a gross capacity of 0.95 million hectares meter and live storage capacity of 0.586 million hectares meter. It occupies an area of 37,000ha with an average length of 214km and width of 1.7km. The river catchment area above the dam site is 88,000 square kilometers. It has a spillway discharging capacity of 87,000 cubic meters a second. This dam is one case study to learn about Integrated River Basin Planning, Development and Management.

Water management 
The reservoir operation in the catchment area during the monsoons (from July to October) is well synchronized with the rain forecast. The River Bed Power House (RPBH) is responsible for strategically maximizing the annual allocation of water share. It ensures that minimum water flows downstream and maximum water is used in the dam over flow period (generally in Monsoons).  In non-monsoon months, RPBH takes measures to minimize the conventional and operational losses, avoiding water storage, restricting water intensive perennial crops, adoption of underground pipelines, proper maintenance of canals, related structures and operation of canals on a rotational basis.

History 
This project was envisioned by the first Home Minister of India, Sardar Vallabhbhai Patel. Jawaharlal Nehru laid the foundation stone of this project in 1961.A thorough survey was carried out by his government to study the usage of the Narmada River which flows through states of Madhya Pradesh and Gujarat to the Arabian Sea.

As the river was shared between the three states (Gujarat, Maharashtra and Madhya Pradesh) there were disputes regarding sharing of water and other important resources. As the negotiations were not successful a report was created and the Narmada Water Dispute Tribunal (NWDT) was established in 1969. In 1979 the NWDT gave its verdict after assessing all the reports.

Importance in Gujarat
This dam is called 'the lifeline of Gujarat'. Seventy five percent of Gujarat's command area is considered a drought prone area, this dam will cater for domestic water supply to the regions of Kutch and Saurashatra. In 2021, for the first time Sardar Sarovar Dam provided waters for irrigation in summers.

Narmada Canal 

The dam provides drinking water to 9490 villages and 173 urban centers in Gujarat; and 1336 villages & 3 towns in Rajasthan. The dam
also provides flood protection to riverine reaches measuring  covering 210 villages and Bharuch city and a population of 400,000 in Gujarat. Saurashtra Narmada Avtaran Irrigation is a major program to help irrigate a lot of regions using the canal's water.

Solar power generation 

In 2011, the government of Gujarat announced plans to generate solar power by placing solar panels over the canal, making it beneficial for the surrounding Villages to get power and also helping to reduce the evaporation of water. The first phase consists of placing panels along a 25 km length of the canal, with a capacity for up to, 25 MW of power.

Statue of Unity 
The Government of Gujarat constructed a statue of Sardar Vallabhbhai Patel as a symbol of tribute. The dam stands in front of the dam and is considered as one of the major tourist attraction.

Rehabilitation

Resettlement policy and strategy 
The Narmada Water Dispute Tribunal, setup by Indian government has provided a policy framework under which rehabilitation of affected people has been implemented.The guiding principles of this policy are: 

 Improve or at least regain the living standard of the project affected people prior to displacement.
Should be relocated to villages units or section according to their preference.
Integration with host community where they have settled.
Appropriately compensated for adequate social and physical rehabilitation including infrastructure and community services.
Active participation of affected people in planning of their rehabilitation.
According to a research paper and survey done by Swaminathan S. Anklesaria Aiyar and Neeraj Kaushal: "Are Resettled Out sees from the Sardar Sarovar Dam Project Better off Today than their Former - despite implementation glitches, those displaced were far better off than their former forest neighbors in ownership of a range of assets including TVs, cellphones, vehicles, access to schools and hospitals, and agricultural markets. The gap in asset ownership and other outcomes between the treatment and comparison groups was often statistically larger if the heads of the household were illiterate compared to the gap if they were literate. This finding suggests that resettlement helped vulnerable groups more than the less vulnerable and that fears that resettlement will destroy the lives and lifestyles of tribal have been grossly exaggerated."

Activism 

The dam is one of India's controversial, and its environmental impact and net costs and benefits are widely debated.The World Bank was initially funding, but withdrew in 1994 at the request of the Government of India when the state governments were unable to comply with the loan's environmental and other requirements. The Narmada Dam has been the center of controversy and protests since the late 1980s.

One such protest takes center stage in the Spanner Films documentary Drowned Out (2002), which follows one tribal family who decide to stay at home and drown rather than make way for the Narmada Dam.
An earlier documentary film is called A Narmada Diary (1995) by Anand Patwardhan and Simantini Dhuru. The efforts of Narmada Bachao Andolan ("Save Narmada Movement") to seek "social and environmental justice" for those most directly affected by the Sardar Sarovar Dam construction feature prominently in this film. It received the (Filmfare Award for Best Documentary-1996).

The figurehead for most part of the protest is Medha Patkar, the leader of the NBA. Patkar's role is questioned in the protest as she is accused of money laundering. Other notable figures who participated in the protest were Baba Amte, Arundhati Roy and Aamir Khan.

Height increases

This came after 2003 when the Supreme Court of India refused to allow the height of the dam to increase again.
 The Narmada Control Authority decided on 17 June 2017 to raise the height of the Sardar Sarovar Dam to its fullest height 163-metre by ordering the closure of 30 gates.
 The water level in the Sardar Sarovar Dam at Kevadia in Narmada district reached its highest capacity at 138.7 metres on 15 September 2019.

References

References
 Sardar Sarovar Narmada Nigam. (01/2002) Retrieved 7 September 2007 Narmada for People and Environment
 Dam-Affected Resettlement in Gujarat, by Chhandasi Pandya. Retrieved 13 July 2007 Article
 
 Association for India's Development website

External links

 Friends of River Narmada
 Official Website of NVDA – Narmada Valley Development Authority
 Official website of Sardar Sarovar Narmada Nigam Limited
 Regularly updated news clippings about Narmada dams
 Concluding letter from Independent Review (also known as Morse Committee) constituted by World Bank in 1992 to assess Sardar Sarovar Dam Project djvu format or in pdf format.

Dams completed in 2006
Energy infrastructure completed in 2006
Hydroelectric power stations in Gujarat
Economy of Madhya Pradesh
Jalore district
Dams in Gujarat
Pumped-storage hydroelectric power stations in India
Dams on the Narmada River
Tapi district
Vallabhbhai Patel
2006 establishments in Madhya Pradesh
2006 establishments in Gujarat